The Woman Who Drinks is a Canadian drama film, released in 2001. Written and directed by Bernard Émond, the film stars Élise Guilbault as a woman struggling with alcoholism.

Synopsis
The film's cast also includes Luc Picard, Michel Forget, Fanny Mallette, Gilles Renaud and Patrice Robitaille.

The film garnered five Genie Award nominations at the 22nd Genie Awards in 2002:
Best Actress: Élise Guilbeault
Best Supporting Actor: Michel Forget
Best Director: Bernard Émond
Best Art Direction/Production Design: André-Line Beauparlant
Best Costume Design: Sophie Lefebvre
Guilbeault won the award for Best Actress.

References

External links
 

2001 films
2001 drama films
Canadian drama films
2000s French-language films
Films directed by Bernard Émond
Films about alcoholism
French-language Canadian films
2000s Canadian films